"She Ain't Your Ordinary Girl" is a song written by Robert Jason, and recorded by American country music group Alabama.  It was released in June 1995 as the lead-off single to their album In Pictures.  It peaked at number 2 on the United States Billboard Hot Country Singles & Tracks chart, behind "Not on Your Love" by Jeff Carson, while it was a number-one hit in Canada.

Critical reception
Deborah Evans Price, of Billboard magazine had a mixed review saying that "Randy Owen's vocals never fail to infuse a song with warmth and personality." She went on to say that the song doesn't seem to be at the level of the band's previous singles.

Chart positions
"She Ain't Your Ordinary Girl" debuted at number 54 on the U.S. Billboard Hot Country Singles & Tracks for the week of July 1, 1995.

Year-end charts

References

1995 songs
Alabama (American band) songs
1995 singles
Song recordings produced by Emory Gordy Jr.
RCA Records singles